The SPACE Tour live album contains the songs from the tour of the same name by StarKid Productions. It was recorded at the tour's last concert at the Gramercy Theatre, New York City on November 27, 2011. The album features live performances of songs from the group's previous productions, and was released digitally on March 13, 2012 through iTunes and Amazon.com. A physical compact disc was later released on March 23, 2012.

Background

The StarKid Precarious Auditory Concert Experience Tour, more commonly abbreviated to The SPACE Tour, was the debut concert tour of StarKid Productions. The tour visited fifteen cities in North America, and consisted of performances of songs from the group's previous productions: Little White Lie, A Very Potter Musical, Me and My Dick, A Very Potter Sequel and Starship.

The seven regular performers for the tour, were occasionally joined by other current or former members of the group. The most notable of which was Darren Criss, who joined the tour for four concerts in Boston and New York City. For the Gramercy Theatre concert, where the album was recorded, there were no guest performers.

The album marks the first time songs referencing Harry Potter have been sold for monetary gain by the group. Previously, songs referencing the series were released for free on the A Very Potter Musical and A Very Potter Sequel soundtrack albums.

Despite being performed on the tour, "It's Over Now" from Little White Lie is not included on the album.

Track listing
All songs written by Darren Criss, except for "Different As Can Be" and "Boy Toy", which are written by A.J. Holmes and Grant Anderson respectively. All songs re-arranged for live performance by Clark Baxtresser.

NB: Tracks which have no featured performers were performed by the entire group.

Personnel

Performers
 Jaime Lyn Beatty
 Brian Holden
 Lauren Lopez
 Joey Richter
 Dylan Saunders
 Meredith Stepien
 Joe Walker

Band
 Charlene Kaye – guitar
 Clark Baxtresser – keyboards
 Mark Swiderski - drums
 Carlos Valdes - bass guitar

Release history

Chart performance

Other appearances 
 All songs on this album are live recordings of previously released tracks.

References

External links
 
 

2012 compilation albums
2012 live albums
2012 soundtrack albums
Works based on Harry Potter
StarKid Productions albums